Ravenea madagascariensis is a species of flowering plant in the family Arecaceae. It is found only in Madagascar. It is threatened by habitat loss.

References

madagascariensis
Flora of Madagascar
Near threatened plants
Taxa named by Odoardo Beccari
Taxonomy articles created by Polbot
Plants described in 1906